The Nonexistent Knight (Italian: Il cavaliere inesistente) is an allegorical fantasy novel by Italian writer Italo Calvino, first published in Italian in 1959 and in English translation in 1962.

The tale explores questions of identity, integration with society, and virtue through the adventures of Agilulf, a medieval knight who exemplifies chivalry, piety, and faithfulness but exists only as an empty suit of armour.

Plot
The protagonists of this novel are two paladins of Charlemagne: the titular non-existent knight, named Agilulf (he is in fact a lucid empty suit of armor) and an inexperienced and passionate young man, Rambaldo. The latter, having arrived at the camp of paladins at the beginning of the novel, wants to avenge his father's death, caused by the Argalif Isoarre; Agilulf instead fights for duty, convinced of his faith, with a value that is admired by all the paladins, but also with a remarkable sense of duty, of precision in controlling the progress of the duties of others and their duties, for which the fellow soldiers find it as capable as it is unpleasant. During the move that Charlemagne made with his paladins to clash with the enemies, they met Gurdulù, a vagabond who let himself be guided by instinct without thinking, and who will be assigned as a squire to Agilulf by order of Charlemagne.

When the battle begins, Rambaldo tries in every way to clash with the murderer of his father, who finally dies because, deprived of his glasses by the boy himself, he is no longer able to defend himself (the Argalif Isoarre is very short-sighted, therefore without glasses he cannot see and direct the course of the battle). Later the young man falls into an ambush, but is saved by the intervention of another knight with a periwinkle armor that, after fighting, moves away without saying a word. Returning to the camp on foot (during the battle his horse died), Rambaldo accidentally discovers that the valiant knight is actually a very charming woman, Bradamante, whom he immediately falls in love with. But the young woman is not interested in him but in Agilulf, the non-existent knight.

During a banquet, the young Torrismondo reveals unexpected facts about the Agilulf knight. In fact he affirms that Sophronia, daughter of the king of Scotland, the woman who Agilulf had saved from the abuse of two brigands fifteen years before, was already then mother of Torrismondo, and therefore was certainly not a virgin; consequently the assignment of the title of knight to Agilulf for having saved a virgin from violence is not valid. The revelation throws the knight into a panic, who, by honor, decides to go and find the girl to prove that she was still pure at the time. Agilulf leaves, followed by Bradamante infatuated with him, who in turn is pursued by Rambaldo, in love with her. On the same evening Torrismondo also left to find his father, or one of the knights of the "Sacred Order of the Knights of the Grail", and to be recognized as a son by this order (given that his mother had revealed that he had conceived it by one of the many knights with whom she had joined, but to consider the whole order father of the child). Torrismondo finds the knights of the Grail, but loses his last hopes when they reveal themselves as a mystical sect, estranged from reality and moreover devoid of ethical conscience and tolerance towards those who do not belong to their order (the first evening after their meeting with Torrismondo, the young man sees them with dismay as they raid a village).

are described briefly, and which lead him to Scotland and then to Morocco, Agilulf finds the woman he was looking for, Sophronia, in the harem of an Arab nobleman, still unharmed, and brings her back to the battlefield of the Franks, to finally prove to the Emperor that the woman was a virgin when he had saved her, and indeed is still a virgin. Torrismondo, however, arrives near the cave where his alleged mother had hidden, and they both surrender to the passion of love, and that is enough to frustrate Agilulf's effort. Eventually it will be discovered that Torrismondo is not the son of Sofronia, but her brother. The two siblings then discover themselves to be half-siblings, and in the end it will be known that Torrismondo is the son of the Queen of Scotland and of the Holy Order, while Sophronia was born years before by the king of Scotland and a peasant woman, and therefore the two, not being relatives, are free to love each other. Agilulf, therefore, has every right to be a knight, but unfortunately, before he can know the truth, he has already taken his own life: before dissolving he bequeaths his white armor to Rambaldo.

Right then a Moorish army makes landing, led by the Muslim nobleman from whose harem Sophronia was freed, a battle is joined between Christians and Saracens, during which Rambaldo dons Agilulf's armor...the pristine, shining coat of armor gets pierced, dented and splattered in blood during the fight (while it always remained spotless while the Nonexistent Knight "inhabited" it...and, after the battle is won by the christian side, Bradamante throws herself at Rambaldo, believing him to be Agilulf. The two consummate their love, with Bradamante so enraptured that she fails to recognize Rambaldo, save at the end. She gets enraged and flees the premises when she realizes that her 'beloved' Agilulf has ceased to exist for good.

Some time later, Sofronia and Torrismondo, now married, and Gurdulù, who seems to be in possession of reasoning skills, settle in a village that the Templars had raided, and they are amazed that the inhabitants had the opportunity to hunt the Templars alone, without the help of any knight.
To tell the whole story is a nun, Sister Teodora, who only at the end reveals that she is nothing but Bradamante, still sought after by Rambaldo. Finally, Rambaldo arrives at the monastery and escapes with Bradamante, who leaves his narrative unfinished.

Themes

Agilulf exists only as the fulfilment of the rules and protocols of knighthood. This theme is strongly connected to modern conditions: Agilulf has been described as "the symbol of the 'robotized' man, who performs bureaucratic acts with near-absolute
unconsciousness." The romance satirises Agilulf as the ideal man yet nonexistent along with many suggestions that Sister Theodora is making up most of the story. In the end, she understands that such a perfect knight could live only in one's imagination.

The idea of confusion of one's own identity with others and the outside world continued to be developed in Calvino's
later works.

Reception

The Nonexistent Knight was collected together with The Cloven Viscount and The Baron in the Trees in a single volume, Our Ancestors, for which Calvino was awarded the Salento Prize in 1960.  The book was adapted into an animated film by Italian director Pino Zac in 1970.

References

Sources

External links 
Pino Zac's Il cavaliere inesistente (1969) at Imdb

Holy Grail in fiction
Italian fantasy novels
Novels by Italo Calvino
Matter of France
1959 fantasy novels